Miconia pastazana is a species of plant in the family Melastomataceae. It is endemic to Ecuador.  Its natural habitats are subtropical or tropical moist lowland forests and subtropical or tropical moist montane forests.

References

pastazana
Endemic flora of Ecuador
Vulnerable flora of South America
Taxonomy articles created by Polbot